Edessa is the historical name of a city in Mesopotamia, now Şanlıurfa, Turkey.

Edessa may also refer to:

Edessa (bug), a large genus of stink bugs
Edessa, Greece
County of Edessa, a crusader state
Osroene, an ancient kingdom and province of the Roman Empire
Bishopric of Edessa
Edessa, birth name of Jarael, a character in Star Wars: Knights of the Old Republic (comics)

See also 

 Edosa, a moth genus
Odessa (disambiguation)
Odesa (disambiguation)